This article is about the particular significance of the year 1921 to Wales and its people.

Incumbents

Archdruid of the National Eisteddfod of Wales – Dyfed

Lord Lieutenant of Anglesey – Sir Richard Henry Williams-Bulkeley, 12th Baronet  
Lord Lieutenant of Brecknockshire – Joseph Bailey, 2nd Baron Glanusk
Lord Lieutenant of Caernarvonshire – John Ernest Greaves
Lord Lieutenant of Cardiganshire – Herbert Davies-Evans
Lord Lieutenant of Carmarthenshire – John Hinds
Lord Lieutenant of Denbighshire – Lloyd Tyrell-Kenyon, 4th Baron Kenyon    
Lord Lieutenant of Flintshire – Henry Gladstone, later Baron Gladstone 
Lord Lieutenant of Glamorgan – Robert Windsor-Clive, 1st Earl of Plymouth
Lord Lieutenant of Merionethshire – Sir Osmond Williams, 1st Baronet
Lord Lieutenant of Monmouthshire – Ivor Herbert, 1st Baron Treowen
Lord Lieutenant of Montgomeryshire – Sir Herbert Williams-Wynn, 7th Baronet 
Lord Lieutenant of Pembrokeshire – John Philipps, 1st Viscount St Davids 
Lord Lieutenant of Radnorshire – Arthur Walsh, 3rd Baron Ormathwaite

Archbishop of Wales – Alfred George Edwards, Bishop of St Asaph

Events
26 January - The Abermule train collision claims 17 lives, including that of the chairman of the rail company, Lord Herbert Vane-Tempest.
18 February - by-election: Ernest Evans becomes Liberal MP for Cardiganshire, winning the seat vacated by Matthew Vaughan-Davies, 1st Baron Ystwyth, on the latter's elevation to the peerage. 
7 March - Francis Edward Mostyn is appointed Roman Catholic Archbishop of Cardiff.
1 April - Alfred Mond becomes Minister of Health.
1 April–28 June - Lockout in the coal mining industry; A. J. Cook, the miner's leader, is sentenced to two months’ imprisonment for "inciting to unlawful assembly".
4 June - Cardiologist Thomas Lewis is awarded a knighthood in King George V's Birthday Honours.
December - Leslie Morris becomes a founder member of the Communist Party of Canada.
date unknown
The Anglo-Persian Oil Company Limited begins work on the UK's first oil refinery at Llandarcy.
Last copper smelting in the Lower Swansea valley.
Hugh Robert Jones founds the Byddin Ymreolaeth Cymru (“Home Rule Army”), which forms the basis for the development of Plaid Cymru.
John Bodvan Anwyl is appointed secretary of the Welsh dictionary project sponsored by the Board of Celtic Studies of the University of Wales.

Arts and literature

Awards
National Eisteddfod of Wales (held in Caernarfon)
National Eisteddfod of Wales: Chair - Robert John Rowlands, "Min y Môr"
National Eisteddfod of Wales: Crown - Albert Evans-Jones

New books

English language
Edwin Sidney Hartland - Primitive Society
Evan Frederic Morgan, 2nd Viscount Tredegar - Trial by Ordeal
Margaret Haig Thomas, Viscountess Rhondda - D. A. Thomas, Viscount Rhondda, by his Daughter and Others
Francis Brett Young - The Black Diamond

Welsh language
Edward Tegla Davies - Tir Y Dyneddon
John Evan Davies - Blodau'r Grug
Moelona - Y Wers Olaf

New drama
Saunders Lewis - The Eve of St John

Music
Ivor Novello & Dion Titheradge - "And Her Mother Came Too"
The composer Peter Warlock returns to the family home at Cefn-bryntalch Hall, near Abermule, where he will stay until June 1924.

Film
A teenage Roger Livesey makes his screen debut in The Four Feathers and in the same year appears in a film version of Where the Rainbow Ends.

Sport
Cricket - Glamorgan CCC is admitted to crickets County Championship competition for the first time.

Births
5 February (in Birkenhead) - Marion Eames, novelist (d. 2007)
16 February - Bob Evans, rugby union international (d. 2003)
19 March - Tommy Cooper, comedian (d. 1984)
3 March - David James, cricketer (d. 2002) 
21 March - Antony Hopkins, composer, pianist, conductor and broadcaster (d. 2014)
4 April - Eileen Beasley, teacher and campaigner (d. 2012)
9 April - Jack Jones, footballer (d. 2001)
6 May - Ted Morris, footballer (d. 2000)
21 May - Leslie Norris, poet (d. 2006)
28 May - Rhys Probert, aeronautical engineer
4 June - Allen Forward, Wales international rugby union player (d. 1994)
8 June - Alwyn Williams, geologist (d. 2004)
28 June - R. Tudur Jones, theologian (d. 1998)
16 August - Roger Ashton (footballer), footballer (d. 1985)
31 August - Raymond Williams, academic and writer (d. 1988)
8 September - Sir Harry Secombe, entertainer (d. 2001)
13 September - Handel Greville, Wales international rugby union player
15 September - Billy Cleaver, Wales international rugby union player and colliery manager (d. 2003)
12 October - Kenneth Griffith, actor and director (d. 2006)
3 October – Graham Davies, footballer (d. 2003)
18 October – Billy James, footballer (d. 1980)
17 December - Ron Davies, photographer (d. 2013)
21 December - T. Harri Jones, poet and academic (d. 1965)

Deaths
11 February - William Evans (Tonyrefail), minister and author, 82
25 February - John Thomas of Llanwrtyd, composer, 81
29 April - Billy Matthews, footballer, 37/38
6 June - James Havard Thomas, sculptor, 66
5 July - Alfred Onions, politician, 62
13 July - Emily Davies, educationist, 90
21 July - Tom Deacon - Wales international rugby union player
27 July 
John Jones (Myrddin Fardd), author, 85
(in London) - James Winstone, miners' leader and politician, 58
6 August (in Ilfracombe) - Sir David Brynmor Jones QC, lawyer and historian, 68 or 69
23 August  (in Oswestry) - Francis Jayne, bishop and academic, 76
31 August  (in Coorparoo, Queensland) - Thomas Rees, mayor of Brisbane, Australia, 76
3 October - William Rhys-Herbert, composer, conductor, organist and pianist, 53
9 October - Gwyneth Bebb, lawyer, 31
11 October - Willie Thomas, Wales international rugby captain, 55
12 November - Edward Windsor Richards, engineer, 90
15 December - Hopkin Maddock, Wales international rugby player, 40
16 December - Owen Morgan, journalist, 85
21 December - Joseph Morewood Staniforth, editorial cartoonist, 57 or 58

See also
1921 in Northern Ireland

References

Wales